Sunil Mani Tiwari is an Indian politician from Bihar and a Member of the Bihar Legislative Assembly. He is also former chairman of Areraj and former BJP district president from East-champaran during 2014 general election. Tiwari won the Govindganj Constituency on the BJP ticket in the 2020 Bihar Legislative Assembly election.

References

Living people
Bihar MLAs 2020–2025
Bharatiya Janata Party politicians from Bihar
1963 births